Cafè Neo is a coffee roaster and coffeehouse chain based in Lagos.

The company started in 2012 as a family-owned chain when brothers Ngozi Dozie and Chijioke Dozie began a coffee roasting business in Lagos. The flagship store is located in Victoria Island, Lagos. Other chains of the brand also operate in the city.

References

External links
 
 

Coffee brands
Nigerian brands
Restaurants established in 2012
Food and drink companies based in Lagos
Nigerian companies established in 2012